Goldkopf (Gold Head) is a mountain of Baden-Württemberg, Germany. It is 324 m above sea level. 

Mountains and hills of Baden-Württemberg